Abohar Junction (station code: ABS) is located in Fazilka district in the Indian state of Punjab and serves Abohar city. Abohar station falls under Ambala railway division of Northern Railway zone of Indian Railways. Abohar city is the administrative headquarter of Abohar Tehsil in Fazilka district.

Overview 
It is one of the oldest train stations established in 1892 on Indian subcontinent during British Raj. This station is located on the single track,  broad gauge, Bathinda–Sri Ganganagar line.

Electrification 
Abohar railway station is situated on single track DMU line. The electrification of the single track BG Bathinda–Abohar–Sriganga Nagar line is in the pipeline.

Amenities 
Abohar railway station has 6 booking windows, one enquiry office and all basic amenities like drinking water, public toilets, sheltered area with adequate seating. Wheelchair availability is also there for disabled persons. There are two platforms at the station and one foot overbridge(FOB).

References

External links 

 Pictures of Abohar Junction railway station

Railway stations in Fazilka district
Ambala railway division